Oleksandr Viktorovych Osman (born 18 April 1996) is a Ukrainian professional footballer who plays as a defender for Obolon Kyiv.

Career
Osman is a product of the UFK Kharkiv and Metalist Kharkiv Youth School Systems. He made his debut for FC Metalist in the match against FC Shakhtar Donetsk on 9 August 2014 in the Ukrainian Premier League.

References

External links
Statistics at FFU website (Ukr)

1996 births
Living people
Ukrainian footballers
Ukraine youth international footballers
FC Metalist Kharkiv players
FC Dynamo Kyiv players
FC Karpaty Lviv players
FC Arsenal Kyiv players
FC Metalist 1925 Kharkiv players
FC Obolon-Brovar Kyiv players
FC Obolon-2 Kyiv players
Ukrainian Premier League players
Ukrainian First League players
Ukrainian Second League players
Association football defenders
Kharkiv State College of Physical Culture 1 alumni
Sportspeople from Kharkiv Oblast